Frigyes Feszl (February 20, 1821 – July 25, 1884) was an architect and a significant figure in the Hungarian romantic movement.

Life
Born in Pest, Hungary, into a family of German origin, Feszl's father was a master wood carver. He was the fifth of fourteen children and two of his brothers, József (1819–1866) and János (1822–1852) also became architects.

Feszl attended the Piarist gymnasium between 1830 and 1835, subsequently studying under architect József Hild. In 1839 he was able to travel overseas and with his brother József enrolled in the Fine Arts Academy in Munich.

He married Regina Hoffman (d. 1851) in 1849 who bore him two children, Regina (1849–1870) and Frigyes (1850-1910). Feszl remarried after his first wife's death, in 1858 he married Vilma Quandt (1827–1902).

Between 1861 and 1865 he studied painting in Paris and became a member of the architect's guild in 1866.  He died in Budapest, aged 63.

Major works 
1845
 Competition design for the Hungarian Parliament, Pest

1846-49
 New Servite Church, Therese town, Pest
 V. Nador street no 22, Oszvald House, Pest
 V. Vaci Street 57, Balassovits House, Pest
 Mor Baths, Pest

1851-53
 Luczenbacher chapel, Szob 
 Budakeszi street 71, Kochmeister villa, Pest
 Heckenaszt villa, Pilismarot
 Kalvin Square Reformation Church, Budapest
 V. Sas Street, Frolich House, Pest

1854-1863
 Inner City Parish Church, Pest (destroyed)
 Vigadó Concert Hall, Pest 
 Dohány Street Synagogue, Pest 
 Summer Theatre, Pest (destroyed)

1872-74
 Boys School and Priest home, VI. Nagymezo street 1., Budapest
 Danube and Castle Hill replanning, Buda
 Primary schools: Bp., VI. Szív u. 19-21.; Bp., VII. Wesselényi u. 52. ; Bp., VIII. Dankó u. 31. ;Bp., X. Szent László tér 34.
 Old Exhibition Hall, Pest.

1876-1884
 Deák mausoleum and statue plans
 Bp., Andrassy avenue 99, Mayer House

(works in collaboration with others: Former Capucine Church, Water town (St Elizabeth Parish Church) and Abbey, Christine Town tunnel entrance, with Jozsef Pan: former London Hotel in the inner city.)

References 
 Translated from Hungarian Wikipedia

External links
 

Hungarian-German people
People from Pest, Hungary
1821 births
1884 deaths
19th-century Hungarian architects